Chilhowee Dam is a hydroelectric dam located in Blount and Monroe counties, Tennessee, United States, between river mile 33 and 34 on the Little Tennessee River. Construction began in 1955 and was completed in 1957. Chilhowee's powerhouse is equipped with three Kaplan turbines that have a combined generating capacity of 48 megawatts.

Like Calderwood and Cheoah, Chilhowee is controlled by TVA's Fontana Dam. Fontana Dam is the primary flow control facility for the lower Little Tennessee River. Tapoco built and operates the Chilhowee Development.

Chilhowee Dam and its powerhouse are listed on the National Register of Historic Places as the Chilhowee Hydroelectric Development.

When the lake is drawn down for maintenance, the remains of the original bridge of US 129 over Abrams Creek can be seen.

References

External links

 Brookfield Smoky Mountain Hydropower (Brookfield)
 Chilhowee Reservoir Information (TVA)

Alcoa Power Generating dams
Buildings and structures in Blount County, Tennessee
Buildings and structures in Monroe County, Tennessee
Dams completed in 1957
Dams in Tennessee
Dams on the National Register of Historic Places in Tennessee
Energy infrastructure completed in 1957
Hydroelectric power plants in Tennessee
Dams on the Little Tennessee River
National Register of Historic Places in Monroe County, Tennessee